Belmont Abbey College is a private, Catholic liberal arts college in Belmont, North Carolina. It was founded in 1876 by the Benedictine monks of Belmont Abbey. The school is affiliated with the Catholic Church and the Order of Saint Benedict. It is endorsed by The Newman Guide to Choosing a Catholic College. Belmont Abbey is the only college in North Carolina affiliated with the Catholic Church.

Offering an undergraduate education, the college enrolls students from diverse ethnic, cultural, and religious backgrounds.

History 

Belmont Abbey College was founded in 1876 as St. Mary's College by Benedictine monks from Saint Vincent Archabbey in Pennsylvania. Father Jeremiah O'Connell purchased Caldwell farm and donated the land to the Benedictines, hoping the community would found a Catholic educational institution in the Carolinas. On April 21, 1876, Father Herman Wolfe, from Saint Vincent, arrived with two students to take possession of the property and begin classes. In 1878, the college held its first commencement exercises. Katharine Drexel, a benefactor of the monastery and college, visited Belmont Abbey in 1904. The present name of the college was adopted in 1913. 

In 1967 John Oetgen, college president and Benedictine priest, conferred an honorary degree on the Protestant evangelist Billy Graham, marking what was at the time seen as a bold ecumenical gesture. 

Originally a college for young men, Belmont Abbey became a coeducational institution in 1972. In 1987, Sacred Heart College for women merged with the abbey, and its campus began to host a variety of abbey classes and programs.

The Belmont Abbey Historic District was listed on the National Register of Historic Places in 1993. It includes at its heart the separately listed Belmont Abbey Cathedral. Other contributing buildings include the Brothers' Building (1893, 1897, 1904), Old Science (1893), Jubilee Hall (1897), The Monastery (1880, 1891, and 1894), the College Building (or Stowe Hall, 1886, 1888, 1898), Saint Leo Hall (1907), and The Haid (1929).

Campus 

Maurus Hall is centrally located on campus and houses a student lounge, grill, and the Holy Grounds coffee shop. Across from Maurus Hall is the Haid, which serves as a student and community theater. The Haid was originally built as a gymnasium. The Abbey Players now perform there.  Along Abbey Lane, towards the far end of the campus, are the Vincent Abbot Taylor Library and the William Gaston Science Hall. Administrative offices are located in Robert Stowe Hall, with classrooms on the second and third floors. St. Leo's Hall, built in the American Benedictine style, houses the Campus Book Store and Catholic Shop on the first floor. Professorial offices are located in St. Leo's Hall, and Grace Auditorium is located on the third floor.

The quad is located between the Poellath and O'Connell residence halls, both constructed in the early 1960s. Raphael Arthur Hall, constructed in 1967, offers students individual rooms and sits on the hill above Poellath, near Campus Police. The St. Joseph's Eucharistic Adoration Chapel, dedicated in 2008, is across from Campus Police. Wheeler Athletic Center, completed in 1970, is located behind Poellath Hall. At the back of the campus are the four Cuthbert Allen Apartment buildings, built in 1989. The newly renovated Student Commons, located next to the new cafeteria, houses the campus mailroom, snack machines, a lounge area, and Student Life offices. Behind the Student Commons are the St. Scholastica and St. Benedict residence halls. The Lourdes Grotto, an official pilgrimage shrine, is situated behind O'Connell Hall.

Mary Help of Christians Abbey Basilica 

The Abbey Church, the most prominent building on the college's campus, was completed in 1894 under the supervision of Abbot Leo Haid. Drexel made significant donations to the completion of the structure, which served as North Carolina's first and only cathedral prior to the erection of the Diocese of Raleigh in 1924. The church is constructed in the gothic-revival style out of brick and granite, built in the shape of a Latin cross. The towers of the church, named Ora (the taller) and Labora (the smaller), can be seen from most of the college campus. The taller of the two towers holds bells which ring to signal the celebration of the Eucharist and the Liturgy of the Hours. The monastic community continues to hold daily services which are open to the student body and the public. Following the Second Vatican Council, the interior of the Abbey Church was renovated in a modernist style in order to facilitate the liturgical reforms of the era. In 1975, Belmont Abbey lost its territorial status and cathedral rank to the newly created Diocese of Charlotte. In 1998 Pope John Paul II named the Abbey Church a minor basilica in recognition of the historic and aesthetic significance of the structure.

Sacred Heart Campus 
The Sisters of Mercy of Belmont reside at Sacred Heart Convent, in downtown Belmont. The convent is located on a campus made up of various organizations including Catherine's House, Holy Angels, and Mercy Heritage Center, archives for the Sisters of Mercy of the Americas. In 1892 the sisters began a finishing school for girls that eventually became a four-year degree institution, Sacred Heart College. Sacred Heart College closed in 1987, and a section of the Sacred Heart College is now rented by Belmont Abbey and called Sacred Heart Campus; classes are offered at Sacred Heart for both traditional and adult degree students. Belmont Abbey continues to offer alumnae services to graduates from Sacred Heart College.

St. Joseph Adoration Chapel 

The Saint Joseph Adoration Chapel was dedicated on November 7, 2008. It marked the first building project under President Bill Thierfelder. Dr. Thierfelder wanted all that came to the Belmont Abbey College campus, that the college finds its center in Jesus Christ. During the Fall and Spring semesters, the chapel is open 24 hours a day for prayers and the Blessed Sacrament is exposed from 6:00am to 9:00pm.

Expansion 
Plans were proposed by the president of the college in 2008 to construct a new residence hall on campus in order to facilitate increased enrollment. In the Fall of 2012, construction began on two new residence halls to open in the Fall of 2013.

In the Summer of 2011, construction began on a state-of-the-art integrated cafeteria. The construction was complete in time for the new cafeteria to open to the student body beginning in the Fall of 2012.

Academics 

The abbey is accredited by the Southern Association of Colleges and Schools and approved by the American Medical Association. More than 80 percent of the faculty at Belmont Abbey hold doctoral degrees in their subjects. After completing a core curriculum, students declare a major and concentrate within their chosen areas of study.

The college's First Year Symposium, required for incoming freshmen, seeks to acclimate new students to college life. Taught by professors from various fields, this course explains the theories of a liberal education and introduces students to the Rule of St. Benedict and the Catholic intellectual tradition.

Athletics 
The Belmont Abbey Crusaders participate in the NCAA's Division II program. The Crusaders are members of Conference Carolinas. Men's and women's lacrosse, women's golf. Men's and women's tennis and men's and women's track and field have been added for the 2009 season. Al McGuire coached Basketball for the Crusaders from 1957 to 1964. During his tenure the team had 5 post-season tournament appearances.
In 2009, the Crusaders Baseball team reached the NCAA Division II World Series, at the USA Baseball Training Complex located in Cary, North Carolina. The Crusaders were ranked 6th in their respective regional tournament and went on to win four straight against nationally ranked teams to capture their first regional championship. The Crusaders fell to eventual National Champions Lynn University after winning two in a row. The Crusaders finished the season ranked 3rd in the Nation.

In 2012, the women's volleyball, women's soccer, and men's basketball teams all won the NCAA Division II Conference Carolinas title. In 2018, the men's lacrosse team won the NCAA Division II Conference Carolinas title.

In 2021, the women's basketball, and men's basketball teams both won the NCAA Division II Conference Carolinas titles.

As a member of Conference Carolinas, Belmont Abbey College competes annually for the league's Messick Award, which is presented for demonstrating the best overall sportsmanship over the entire conference schedule. As of 2019, Belmont Abbey Athletics has won the overall Messick Award four times: 2011–12, 2012–13, 2013–14 (tie) and 2016–17.

Student life

Organizations and Greek life 
The Abbey has over 40 student organizations, an active Student Government Association, and many Greek organizations belonging to the college's Greek Council. Kappa Sigma is the only active fraternity on campus. Active sororities are Tau Kappa Delta and Alpha Sigma Pi, and also active is the community and collegiate service organization Epsilon Sigma Alpha.

Abbey Players 

Belmont Abbey has a theatre department. The Abbey Players were founded in 1883, and have been a part of campus life ever since. At present, the theatre produces six shows a year, representing a wide repertoire of drama, comedy and musicals. Participation in the Abbey Players is open to any interested member of the college community; students, faculty, staff, and monks regularly appear together. In addition, it functions as the Belmont Community Theatre, which brings in theatre artists from the surrounding Metrolina area.

Glee Club 
In 1940, the Belmont Abbey and Sacred Heart Glee Clubs toured the Carolinas and Georgia, appearing in Columbia, Charleston, Augusta, Greensboro, Raleigh, and Wilmington.

Dining 
The campus cafeteria is located on the residential side of campus, next to the Walter Coggins Student Commons. Robert Lee Stowe Hall contains a grill and Holy Grounds coffee shop.

Housing 
Incoming freshmen are required to live in either Poellath or O'Connell, two-story single-sex residence halls. Beginning in fall 2013, upperclassmen were given the option to live in the newly built Saint Benedict Hall and Saint Scholastica Hall, single-sex residence halls for males and females respectively. Raphael Arthur Hall provides single rooms. In addition to the five residence halls on campus, upperclassmen are eligible to live in either one of the four on-campus Cuthbert Allen apartment buildings or the Cloisters, off-campus apartments in nearby Mount Holly, North Carolina.

Controversies

Faculty health care coverage controversy 

In 2007 the college's administration removed healthcare coverage for "abortion, contraception, and voluntary sterilization" after discovering that these were covered by the college's healthcare policy. Eight faculty members responded by filing complaints to the North Carolina Department of Insurance, the Equal Employment Opportunity Commission, and the National Women's Law Center. The latter threatened a lawsuit on behalf of the eight faculty members, several of whom were allegedly lifelong Catholics.

After the student newspaper, The Crusader, published an article in May 2008 pointing out that the abbey profits from the sale of contraceptives at two convenience stores that lease land from the abbey, the Abbot responded by stating that: ""[They] are preponderantly good operations, i.e. 99 percent or more of their business is not problematic, and the employment generation and economic stimulation they provide for the community of Belmont are worth tolerating a small amount of evil. The abbey is not willing to lease to them because they sell contraceptives, but despite it."

Lawsuit against the Obama administration
According to a November 11, 2011 online news story by Patricia L. Guilfoyle of Catholic News Service, "Belmont Abbey College is suing the federal government over a new regulation that requires employer health insurance plans to provide free coverage of contraceptives and sterilization, even if it may be contrary to their religious beliefs."

Objection to a local no-kill shelter
According to a June 20, 2013 online news story by the Associated Press, Belmont Abbey College objected to the rezoning of a nearby 6-acre piece of land that would have been used for a no-kill shelter.

LGBT anti-discrimination 
In 2016, the college, along with other religious colleges and universities throughout the United States, came under increasing criticism from LGBT activists for refusing to implement anti-discrimination policies on behalf of lesbian, gay, bisexual, and transgender students. Belmont Abbey College argued that its status as a primarily Catholic institution was in conflict with these anti-discrimination policies. In a statement, the college claimed that such policies would "abdicate the responsibility of the college community as a whole to act in accord with its fundamental identity as a community which publicly identifies itself as in communion with the Catholic Church."

Notable alumni 
 Jordan Anderson – NASCAR driver
 David Brumbaugh – Oklahoma House of Representatives
 Joseph Cryan – State senator and former New Jersey General Assembly Majority Leader
 Clay Dimick – soccer player
 Joseph Lennox Federal – Bishop of Salt Lake City from 1960 to 1980
 Hal Haid – baseball player
 Winder R. Harris – U.S. Representative from Virginia
 Nikki Hornsby – musician
 Franklin Lawson – soccer coach for Georgia Perimeter College
 Robert G. Marshall – Virginia House of Delegates
 Patrick McHenry – U.S. Representative from North Carolina
 Eugene O'Dunne – pioneering anti-racist judge on the Supreme Bench of Baltimore
 Emilio Pagan – baseball player
 Alex Pledger – basketball player
Michal Smolen – slalom canoeist
 Tony Suarez – soccer player
 Vincent Stanislaus Waters – Bishop of the Roman Catholic Diocese of Raleigh
 Patti Wheeler – President and owner of Wheeler Television Inc.

References

External links

 
 Belmont Abbey Crusaders Athletics
 Belmont Abbey College student yearbooks

 
Education in Gaston County, North Carolina
Charlotte metropolitan area
Roman Catholic Diocese of Charlotte
Liberal arts colleges in North Carolina
Educational institutions established in 1876
Universities and colleges accredited by the Southern Association of Colleges and Schools
Association of Catholic Colleges and Universities
Benedictine colleges and universities
Buildings and structures in Gaston County, North Carolina
1876 establishments in North Carolina
Catholic universities and colleges in North Carolina
University and college buildings on the National Register of Historic Places in North Carolina
National Register of Historic Places in Gaston County, North Carolina
Historic districts on the National Register of Historic Places in North Carolina